Aphelochaeta praeacuta is a species of bitentaculate cirratulidan first found in the Pacific coast of Costa Rica, at a shallow subtidal depth of about  in Bahia Culebra. It is characterised by possessing a first peristomial annulation that extends as a dorsal crest over the second annulation and first setiger.

References

External links
WORMS

Terebellida